The PZL-105 Flaming (flamingo) is a Polish short-takeoff-and-landing (STOL) utility aircraft designed by PZL "Warszawa-Okęcie". It remained a prototype.

Development
The PZL-105 was designed as a successor to the successful utility aircraft PZL-104 Wilga, being more modern and economical and offering increased transport capacity. The design was initially called Wilga 88. It retained the high-wing layout of the PZL-104 and the upward-opening side doors, but it was a completely new aircraft. Compared with the Wilga, it has a six-seat cabin instead of four seats and the wings are supported by single struts instead of a cantilever design. The plane was intended for a variety of purposes, like glider towing, parachute training, transport, air ambulance, patrolling and crop dusting (with 500 kg of chemicals). Also, a seaplane variant was intended.

The first prototype, powered by a  265 kW (360 hp) Russian M-14P radial engine, was first flown on 9 November 1989 (markings SP-PRC). An intended designation of a serial variant was PZL-105M. The second prototype, designated PZL-105L, was fitted with a flat engine 298 kW (400 hp) Lycoming IO-720. It was flown on 27 July 1991 (markings SP-PRD). There was also made one prototype for static trials.

Problems with funding at the outbreak of the 1980s and 1990s, connected with a change of political system in Poland, and  the priority of the PZL-130 Orlik trainer program, had caused the Flaming program to be suspended, and production of the type has yet to have started. The company developed a new variant of the PZL-104, the Wilga 2000 with Lycoming I0-540 flat engine instead.

Design
Metal construction braced high-wing monoplane, conventional in layout, duralumin covered. Semi-monocoque fuselage. Rectangular single-spar wings, fitted with Fowler flaps and slotted flaperons. Six-seat cabin with three rows of seats, with large side doors opening upwards. Conventional fixed landing gear with tail wheel, the main gear is made of composite spring legs. Two-blade or three-blade (PZL-105L) metal propeller. Fuel tanks in wings (270 L).

Surviving aircraft
The first prototype and the second prototype airframe (lacking engine) are in a collection of the Polish Aviation Museum in Kraków.

Specifications (PZL-105M)

See also

References

Further reading

External links

Photos at Lotnictwo.net

1980s Polish civil utility aircraft
PZL aircraft
Single-engined tractor aircraft
High-wing aircraft
Aircraft first flown in 1989